Ennis Esmer (born December 29, 1978) is a Turkish-Canadian actor, comedian, voice actor, writer, producer and presenter. He is best known for his roles as Osman 'Oz' Bey in The Listener, Kurtis 'Maz' Mazhari in Private Eyes, Nash in Red Oaks, and as Rich Dotcom in Blindspot – a role that was specifically written for him.

Early life
Esmer was born in Ankara, Turkey, before moving to Toronto, Ontario, Canada, at the age of 3. His father, Demir, and his mother, Alev, were both systems analysts. As a child, Esmer learned English by watching Canadian television – which included programs like Sesame Street and Today's Special. His parents divorced in his early teens, and his father remarried to Esmer's stepmother, Florence. Esmer attended Earl Haig Secondary School, in the Toronto suburb of North York, participating in the Claude Watson Program for gifted arts students. During his time at the school, he took improv and experimental theatre classes, was elected to student council, and produced school assemblies which became miniature talent showcases.

Esmer then attended the York University drama program for three years but left before completing it. He struggled with the limitations it set on his natural comedic abilities and has said that part of this at the time was an issue of confidence and maturity. However, even after leaving the university and for many years has continued to study and work with David Rotenberg, a York University professor emeritus of Theatre Studies and the artistic director of his own Professional Actor's Lab – and has said that Rotenberg was the person who allowed him to actually work on his dramatic ability without calling his comedic gifts a crutch. Esmer also did some training at Second City and has worked every comedy stage in Toronto.

Career
Esmer first came to prominence as the writer and host of Toronto 1's short-lived variety series The Toronto Show in 2003. His first acting role that got him notice was in 2006, as the temperamental janitor Zoltan in the Gemini Awards-winning Billable Hours – this role set a precedent in Esmer's career, as what was originally a one-off appearance was expanded to a recurring role because of the popularity of his take on it. His next major role came in 2009 in The Listener as Osman 'Oz' Bey, the best friend of the main character Toby Logan (played by Craig Olejnik). Esmer was nominated once in 2010 for an ACTRA Award, and twice in 2010 and 2011 for Canadian Comedy Awards for this role. In the opposite seasons to shooting The Listener in Toronto, Esmer was shooting his role as Eddie, the apartment complex manager, in The L.A. Complex in Los Angeles – a situation that would repeat in his career.

Starting in 2014, Esmer had regular roles in You Me Her, Private Eyes, Red Oaks, and Blindspot, once again often shooting in opposite or even the same seasons. In Audience Network's polyamorous comedy You Me Her, he played Dave Amari, best friend and neighbour of Jack Trekarsky, the 'Him' of the title. In Global Television Network/Ion Television's Private Eyes, he played Kurtis 'Maz' Mazhari, a Detective who helped main characters Matt Shade (played by Jason Priestley) and Angie Everett (played by Cindy Sampson) solve crimes. He would be nominated in 2019 for a Canadian Screen Award for Best Supporting Actor in a Comedy at the 7th Canadian Screen Awards for this latter role.

In Amazon Studios 1980's set comedy-drama Red Oaks, he played the Turkish lothario tennis instructor Nash. He said of the role, 'It's fun to play a character who is a pretty decent representation of my ethnicity...His ethnicity doesn't define the role, and he gets to be a full person aside from that, and in fact, because of that.' In NBC's Blindspot, Esmer again took a role that was an originally a one-off spot in season one, and went first to recurring then series regular in season four. His instinctive improvisational style and delivery made fan-favourite Rich Dotcom what the show creator Martin Gero said was the character that defined the series.<ref>[https://deadline.com/2018/08/blindspot-ennis-esmer-promoted-series-regular-nbc-drama-series-rich-dotcom-1202450928/ Blindspot': Ennis Esmer Promoted To Series Regular On NBC Drama Series'], Deadline website, August 23, 2018, Retrieved August 7, 2021</ref> Esmer also had a memorable 3-episode arc as Emir Kaplan, the travel blogger who broke Stevie Budd's heart, in season five of the Emmy Award-winning comedy series Schitt's Creek.

Upcoming, Esmer is to star in CTV's comedy Children Ruin Everything.

Esmer has also undertaken several hosting duties in Canada – hosting, among others, the Gemini Awards twice, and the ACTRA Awards, even virtually hosting the feature films section of Directors Guild of Canada Awards in 2020, during the COVID-19 pandemic. He also presented Wipeout Canada and the upcoming Roast Battle Canada, the Canadian version of Jeff Ross Presents Roast Battle.

In film, Esmer has worked extensively in Canadian indie short and feature-length films. He started his film career in a bit part as Ronnie in the American film How to Deal in 2003. His breakout film role was in 2007's Young People Fucking, co-written by his longtime friend and later Blindspot showrunner Martin Gero and other longtime friend Aaron Abrams. This film was notable not just for winning multiple Genie Awards and nearly sweeping the film category of the Canadian Comedy Awards, but also because of the furor around funding caused politically by its name and perceived content. 
 
In 2014, Esmer starred in his first lead film role as Leonard Crane, a small-town newspaper reporter, in Big News from Grand Rock, a comedy-drama about the demise of small-town newspapers – on which he also served as an executive-producer. The same year, he played a supporting role as Sean in the romantic comedy Dirty Singles, for which he was nominated for an ACTRA Award, and won best male performance at the Canadian Comedy Awards. In 2015, he played a supporting role in sex comedy How to Plan an Orgy in a Small Town, directed by Jeremy Lalonde, again serving as executive-producer. In 2016, he played a supporting role in Miss Sloane with Jessica Chastain. That same year, he played Moe, a flight crash investigator, in the television film Brace for Impact, for which he was nominated for a Canadian Screen Award for Best Performance by Supporting Actor in a Drama at the 6th Canadian Screen Awards in 2018. Also in 2018, he played the astrophysicist Charlie in Clara'', a science-fiction film which won the Jury Prize at the Austin Film Festival.

Personal life
Esmer is in a long-term relationship with Amy Blaxland – a stylist, costume designer and businesswoman.

For many years, Ennis Esmer has been involved in many charities, both publicly and privately, focusing on homelessness, poverty, sick children, and reading – especially in the Greater Toronto area.

Esmer is also a lifelong Toronto Raptors and Toronto Blue Jays fan. He is the originator of the nickname 'Spice and Dice' for Toronto Raptors' Pascal Siakam and Fred VanVleet.

Filmography

References

External links

 

1978 births
Living people
Canadian male comedians
Canadian male film actors
Canadian male television actors
Canadian male voice actors
Canadian television variety show hosts
Comedians from Toronto
People from Ankara
Male actors from Toronto
Turkish emigrants to Canada
21st-century Canadian male actors
Canadian Comedy Award winners